Attijariwafa Bank is a Moroccan multinational commercial bank and financial services company founded and based in Rabat, Morocco. It is the leading bank in Morocco and is part of Al Mada holding company.

It was established after a merger between Banque Commerciale du Maroc and Wafabank and is headquartered in Casablanca. It is the fourth largest in Africa in 2016.

The bank maintains offices in Europe and UK Asia, China, Africa, Paris, Brussels, Madrid, Barcelona, Milan, Shanghai, The Netherlands, Tunisia, Egypt, Senegal, Ghana, Mauritania and Mali. It has been listed on the Casablanca Stock Exchange since 1993.

History 
On 8 November 2022, Attijariwafa Bank Partnered with Union Bank of Nigeria to Expand its Operations in Africa.

Ownership
Al Mada 47.77%
Others 13.83%
MCMA-MAMDA 8.09%
Wafa Assurance 6.61%
SANTUSA HOLDING (Santander Group) 5.27%
Employees 4.54%
RCAR (CDG) 4.26%
CIMR 2.34%
CDG 	2.31%
CAISSE MAROCAINE DE RETRAITE (CMR) 	2.27%
AXA ASSURANCES MAROC 1.37%
RMA-WATANYA 1.32%
WAFACORP 0.03%
Source:

Subsidiaries
Wafa Assurance
Wafa Cash
Wafa Gestion
Wafa Salaf
Attijari Bank Tunisie
Wafa Immobilier
Wafabail

Key people
Mohamed El Kettani, chair of the board and managing director
Abdelaziz Alami, honorary chair
Antonio Escamez Torres, vice-chairman of the board
Mohamed Arroub, chair of the board and managing director of Wafa Assurance SA
Mouawia Essekelli, managing director of Attijariwafa bank Europe
Laila Mamou, chairp of the Management Board of Wafasalaf
Abdelkrim Raghni, managing director of CBAO Groupe Attijariwafa bank
Wafaa Guessous, secretary
Hassan Bouhemou, director-representative of SNI
Mounir Majidi, director-representative of SIGER
Javier Hidalgo Blazquez, director-representative of Grupo Santander
Hassan Ouriagli, director
Jose Reig Echeveste, director
Manuel Varela, director-representative of Grupo Santander
Abed Yacoubi Soussane, director

Source:

References

External links

Attijariwafa Bank Portal – French language
 company profile at Reuters 

Banks of Morocco
Banks established in 2004
Société Nationale d'Investissement
2004 establishments in Morocco
Casablanca
Moroccan brands